Marek Niit (born 9 August 1987, in Kuressaare) is a sprinter from Estonia who won gold medal at the  200 metres at the 2006 World Junior Championships in Athletics in Beijing, China. He is also the current national record holder in 100 metres, 200 meters and 400 meters.

International competitions

Personal Best

Personal bests – Outdoor
100 meters –  10.19 s (2012) Arkansas Spring Invitational NR
200 meters – 20.43 s (2011) NCAA Division I Championships NR
300 meters – 32.24 s (2014) Rieti Meeting 2014 NR
400 meters – 45.74 s (2014) European Championships NR

Personal bests – Indoor
50 meters – 5.92 s (2008)
60 meters – 6.73 s (2007)
200 meters – 20.63 s (2014) NR
400 meters – 45.99 s (2011) NR
600 meters – 1.22,92 (2011)

References

1987 births
Living people
Sportspeople from Kuressaare
Estonian male sprinters
Athletes (track and field) at the 2012 Summer Olympics
Olympic athletes of Estonia
Arkansas Razorbacks men's track and field athletes
World Athletics Championships athletes for Estonia
Estonian expatriate sportspeople in the United States
European Games competitors for Estonia
Athletes (track and field) at the 2019 European Games